The Fan is a novel by Peter Abrahams, published in 1995. It is a psychological thriller that follows Gil Renard as he progresses into his own insanity. The story revolves around the sport of baseball, and explores the overt dedication displayed by some of its fanatics.

In 1996, the novel was adapted to film as The Fan.

Reception
Publishers Weekly called it a "taut novel" and a "finely crafted, edge-of-the-seat thriller."  Warren Goldstein, in The Washington Post, wrote that it was a "finely-crafted suspense story."  Kirkus Reviews considered it "forceful, straight-ahead storytelling, a tale of two fascinating characters set against the backdrop of Major League Baseball."

References

1995 American novels
American thriller novels
Baseball novels
Works about stalking
American novels adapted into films